Siddammanahalli  is a village in the southern state of Karnataka, India. It is located in the Bellary taluk of Bellary district in Karnataka.

Demographics
 India census, Siddammanahalli had a population of 6133 with 3047 males and 3086 females.

See also
 Bellary
 Districts of Karnataka

References

External links
 http://Bellary.nic.in/

Siddammanahalli or Siddammana Halli derives its name from a person called Siddamma who was supposed to have lived here and halli is for village.

Education:

There are three primary Schools of which one is the Government run primary school in Kannada medium and there are two privately run English and Kannada Medium Primary School. Most of the village students go to neighbouring Bellary for further studies. The nearest high school is in Kuditini.  Some of the children of this village become engineers, doctors, and other professionals and have migrated to various parts of India and abroad.

Transport:

It is connected to Kuditini, Kurugodu, and Bellary by KSRTC buses.
There are plenty of privately run jeeps and autos connecting the village to neighbouring Kuditini and Kurugodu.
Though buses reach Bellary via Kuditini, most of the people with their own vehicles use the country route via a village called Yerangli and Kollagal to reach Bellary.

Occupation:

Agriculture is the predominant occupation. Many landlords lease their lands for agriculture on various non-written contracts. The Bulibayappa temple is situated in this camp which is the most important temple for the people of Siddammanahalli. This village has the highest irrigated land in Bellary District.

Health: There is Primary Health Centre with a Doctor available during weekdays and many surrounding village people come here for treatment. There are a couple of RMP Doctors who run private clinics. There were a couple of HIV related deaths and many people are aware as a result of the modes of transmission. Still the access to health care, sanitation, and basic amenities are poor.

However, there is a good supply of drinking water due to development of a water lake. There is a power cut for 12 hours per day as compared 1–2 hours in urban areas.

Religion and Caste: Majority of the population is Hindu. Predominant Caste is Reddys, Boya, and Madigas.  There are few Lingayath and Kuruba families and one Muslim family (maybe more). There were a couple of caste related clashes in the last 2 decades, however, in last few years the incidences are becoming less frequent and people are living peacefully, particularly last 7–10 years have been very peaceful.

Every year on the third Saturday of Shravan masa according to the Hindu calendar special prayers are held in the Bulibayyappa temple in Maruthi camp.  It is a very auspicious day for the citizens of the village.  There is a strong belief among the village members that on this night that Lord Hanuman visits this temple to offer his blessings and wishes to the devotees.

The village priest does a special prayer which starts with a bath in the village salt water well and he proceeds to the Maruthi camp on foot to offer prayers in the Bulibayappa temple.  A fire torch is carried along and there is a myth that once they had run out of oil en route to the temple and the priest advised filling it water and the fire torch was lit and the procession continued.

On this day all the family members who have migrated to different places reunite with their respective families to celebrate this important festival of the village. The next day there is pulling of the Village Car called theru in Kannadaa and Telugu. Ugadhi, Gouri Pournima, Diwali, Ganesh, and Chthurthi are some of the festivals people celebrate here.

Language:

Telugu and Kannada are two of the important languages spoken.

Politics:

Traditionally the loyalties of people were divided between the Congress and Janata Party and later Janata Dals(S).  In the recent years due to the emergence of BJP and the influence of Reddy Brothers in Bellary, the people have shifted their loyalties to BJP. However, with the decline of the Reddy brothers, the people are likely to align with N Suryanarayana Reddy of JDS party.

Sports: 

Cricket is the popular game followed/played. Traditional games like gill danda etc. are still popular.

Health: There was an epidemic of Dengue illness in this village which drew national attention.

Leptospirosis: The "mysterious" mimic

Ricardo Izurieta,1 Sagar Galwankar,2 and Angela Clem2

Villages in Bellary district